"26 Miles (Santa Catalina)" is a popular song by the 1950s and 1960s pop band The Four Preps. It reached number two on the Billboard Hot 100 and number six on the Billboard R&B chart in 1958. The song sold over a million copies  and the group appeared on several television shows, including The Gisele MacKenzie Show (March 15, 1958) and The Ed Sullivan Show.

Credits
Conductor [Orchestra]: Lincoln Mayorga (tracks: B)
Writers: Bruce Belland, Glenn Larson*

History
At the age of 15, the band's lead singer Bruce Belland broke his ankle and took up the ukulele to pass the time while recuperating. He learned four chords, which ended up becoming the song's opening music. The chorus was developed some time later when, while body surfing at a California beach, Belland's friend said he could see Santa Catalina 26 miles away. The main theme is summed up in the last line in the refrain, stating that Santa Catalina is "the island of romance", with the word "romance" repeated four times.

In the 1950s, 1960s, and 1970s, the group amassed eight gold singles and three gold albums. Its million-selling signature tunes included "26 Miles," "Big Man," "Lazy Summer Night," and "Down by the Station." Bruce Belland, Ed Cobb, Marv Ingram, and Glen Larson were students at Hollywood High School and were signed to a recording contract by Capitol Records, after one of Capitol's executives saw them at a talent show at that school in 1956.

Their biggest hit was "26 Miles (Santa Catalina)," which reached number 2 in 1958. The record sold over one million copies, earning a gold disc. Glen Larson also receives credit for writing the song, as he contributed to the lyrics.

Cover versions
The song was covered by Dent May on his album Dent May & His Magnificent Ukulele.

Influences
The song served as an influence to Beach Boys singer Brian Wilson, as well as Jimmy Buffett. Neil Peart, lyricist/drummer of the band Rush, recalls that it is one of the first pop music songs that he remembers listening to as a child, stating "I heard that song many times that year (1958). The chorus echoes readily in memory, with its lilting shuffle."

In popular culture
The song was one of many California-related songs played throughout "Sunshine Plaza" in the original Disney California Adventure.

The song was featured playing on a radio in the opening scene of Bad Times at the El Royale.

SI reference
An alternate chorus in the song includes the words "Forty kilometers in a leaky old boat . . .", a rare mention of a metric unit in American popular music, and a tolerably accurate conversion (26 miles = 41.8 km).

References

External links
 Four Preps, The – 26 Miles (Santa Catalina)
  YouTube : The Gisele MacKenzie show from March 15, 1958

American pop songs
1957 singles
1957 songs
Capitol Records singles
The Four Preps songs
Songs written by Bruce Belland
Songs written by Glen A. Larson